was a Japanese politician and journalist of the Meiji era.  He served as the 3rd President of the House of Peers and 7th President of the Gakushūin Peer's School in Meiji period Japan. He was also the father of Prime Minister Fumimaro Konoe.

Political career 
After the Meiji Restoration, the Konoe family were devolved from the ranks of the nobility and given the peerage title of Duke (koshaku) under the new kazoku peerage system. From 1885 to 1890, Konoe visited Europe, attending the University of Bonn and University of Leipzig in Germany. After returning to Japan, he became a member of the House of Peers and in 1895 became president of Gakushuin Peer's School.

Later Konoe served as the 3rd President of the House of Peers, presiding over its 10th through 18th sessions from October 3, 1896, to December 4, 1903. From 1903 he concurrently served as a Privy Councillor.

Domestically, Konoe was a strong critic of clan-based politics, which continued to dominate the political scene in Japan. In terms of foreign policy, Konoe was a central figure in the Pan-Asian Movement. The college recruited students from Japan wishing to learn the Chinese language and Chinese culture, and sponsored a school in Tokyo for Chinese students seeking higher education in Japan (its successor institution being that of ). The society also published a scholarly journal and an 11,000-page report, entitled A Comprehensive Book on the Economics Conditions in China. Graduates of both schools were highly sought after by the Japanese military, Japanese secret intelligence services and ultranationalist organizations for their language skills and in-depth knowledge of China. Many of its graduates later worked for the government of Manchukuo in the 1930s.

Konoe personally urged that Japan declare war on Russia, but died before the start of the Russo-Japanese War in late 1904.

His grave is at the Konoe family cemetery at Daitoku-ji in Kyoto.

Notes

References 
 Bergere, Marie-Clarie. Sun Yat-Sen. Stanford University Press (2000) 
 Duus, Peter. The Abacus and the Sword: The Japanese Penetration of Korea, 1895–1910 (Twentieth-Century Japan – the Emergence of a World Power, 4). University of California Press (1998). .
 Jansen, Marius B. (2000). The Making of Modern Japan. Cambridge: Harvard University Press. ;  OCLC 44090600
 Keene, Donald. (2002). Emperor of Japan: Meiji and His World, 1852–1912. New York: Columbia University Press. ; OCLC 46731178
 Nussbaum, Louis-Frédéric and Käthe Roth. (2005).  Japan encyclopedia. Cambridge: Harvard University Press. ;  OCLC 58053128

External links 
 – Bio and Photo in National Diet Library

1863 births
1904 deaths
Members of the House of Peers (Japan)
Politicians from Kyoto Prefecture
Kazoku
People of Meiji-period Japan
Konoe family
Writers from Kyoto Prefecture